The Khasi people are an ethnic group of Meghalaya in north-eastern India with a significant population in the bordering state of Assam, and in certain parts of Bangladesh. Khasi people form the majority of the population of the eastern part of Meghalaya, that is Khasi Hills, constituting 78.3% of the region's population, and is the state's largest community, with around 48% of the population of Meghalaya. They are among the few Austroasiatic-speaking peoples in South Asia. The Khasi tribe holds the distinction of being one of the few remaining matriarchal tribes of the world. Under the Constitution of India, the Khasis have been granted the status of Scheduled Tribe.

History

Khasi mythology

According to the Khasi mythology,  (God, the Lord Master) had originally distributed the human race into 16 heavenly families. However, seven out of these 16 families were stuck on earth while the other 9 in heaven. According to the myth, a heavenly ladder resting on the sacred Lum Sohpetbneng Peak (located in the present-day Ri-Bhoi district) enabled people to go freely and frequently to heaven whenever they pleased until one day they were tricked into cutting a divine tree which was situated at Lum Diengiei Peak (also in present-day East Khasi Hills district), a grave error which prevented them access to the heavens forever. This myth is often seen as a metaphor of how nature and trees, in particular, are the manifestation of the divine on Earth and destroying nature and trees means severing our ties with the Divine. Like the Japanese, the Khasis use the rooster as a symbol because they believe that it was he who aroused God and also humbly paved and cleared the path for God to create the Universe at the beginning of time. The rooster is the symbol of morning marking a new beginning and a new sunrise.

Khasian is closely related to Palaungic language of Myanmar. Pre-Khasian migrated through Upper Burma to Brahmaputra Valley on the way to Meghalaya.

Language

The Khasi language is classified as part of the Austroasiatic language family. According to Peter Wilhelm Schmidt, the Khasi people are related to the Mon-Khmer people of Southeast Asia. Multiple types of research indicate that the Austroasiatic populations in India are derived from migrations from Southeast Asia during the Holocene period. Many of the words are similar to other Austroasiatic languages such as Palaung and Khmer language:

 Tiger:  in both Khasi and Khmer.
 To fly:  in Khasi, haer in Khmer
 Belly:  in Khasi, poh in Khmer, bung in Vietnamese. 
 Year:  in Khasi, chnem in Khmer, nam in Vietnamese 
 Far:  in Khasi, chngay in Khmer, ngay in Vietnamese
 Crab:  in Khasi, ktam in Khmer
 Fingers:  in only the pnar dialect (Khasi sub-tribe), mreamdai in Khmer, ngon tay in Vietnamese. 
 Toes:  in the pnar dialect (Khasi sub-tribe)], mreamcheung in Khmer, ngon chan in Vietnamese. 
 Birds:  in Khasi, 'chim in Vietnamese
 Fish:  in Khasi, ca in Vietnamese
 Mother:  in Khasi, mẹ in Vietnamese, mea also in the Thai a kra-dai language family
 Rice:  in Khasi, gao in Vietnamese; in Thai also khaw 
 Python: Thlen in Khasi, psathlan in Khmer. 

There are also words similar to those in Sino-Tibetan languages, such as  meaning "I," which is the same in Tibetan, Burmese, and Old Chinese as it is in Khasi. Traces of connections with the Kachin tribe of North Myanmar have also been in the Khasis. The Khasi people also have their own word for the Himalayan mountains which is Ki Lum Mankashang which means that at one point in time, they did cross the mighty mountains. Therefore, all these records and their present culture, features, and language strongly show that they also have a strong Tibeto-Himalayan-Burman influence. The word "Khas" means hills and they have always been people of cold and hilly regions and have never been connected to the plains or arid regions. This nature-loving tribe calls the wettest place on Earth their home. The village of Mawsynram in Meghalaya receives 467 inches of rain per year.

Primarily an oral language, they had no script of their own, until the arrival of the Welsh missionaries. The Welsh missionaries originally used the Bengali script before resorting to the Roman script to transcribe the Sohra dialect of the Khasi language. Particularly significant in this regard was a Welsh evangelist, Thomas Jones.

Modern times

The Khasi first came in contact with the British in 1823, after the latter captured Assam. The area inhabited by the Khasi became a part of the Assam Province after the Khasi Hill States (which numbered to about 25 kingdoms) entered into a subsidiary alliance with the British.

The main crops produced by the Khasi people are betel leaves, areca nut, oranges, pineapples, plums, litchis, local varieties of rice and vegetables.

Geographical distribution and sub-groups 

Many Khasi sociologists classify the Khasi tribe in the following seven sub-tribes, which are collectively also known as the Children of the Seven Huts: 

 Khynriam (or Nongphlang): inhabit the uplands of the East Khasi Hills district.
 Pnar (or Synteng) live in the uplands of the Jaintia Hills district. 
 Bhoi live in the lower hills to the north and north-east of the Khasi and Jaintia Hills towards the Brahmaputra valley in a vast area in Ri-Bhoi district. 
 War subdivided into War-Jaintia and War-Khynriam tribes live on the steep southern slopes of Khasi Hills leading to Bangladesh.
 Maram inhabit the uplands of the central parts of West Khasi Hills District. 
 Lyngngam  inhabit the western parts of the West Khasi Hills  district bordering the Garo Hills display linguistic and cultural characteristics which show influences from both the Khasis to their east and the Garo people to the west. 
 Diko are extinct group who once inhabited the lowlands of the West Khasi Hills District.

According to the 2011 Census of India, over 1.41 million Khasi lived in Meghalaya in the districts of East Khasi Hills, West Khasi Hills, South West Khasi Hills, Eastern West Khasi Hills, Ri-Bhoi, West Jaintia Hills and East Jaintia Hills which togetherly constitute the Eastern part of Meghalaya's Khasi and Jaintia Hills region. In Assam, their population reached 35 thousand. In Bangladesh's Sylhet Division specially in Jaflong, around 85 thousand Khasis are living there.

Dress

Nowadays, most male Khasis have adopted western attire.

On ceremonial occasions, they may wear a crown of silver or gold. A spike or peak is fixed to the back of the crown, corresponding to the feathers worn by the menfolk. The  consists of two pieces of material fastened at each shoulder. The "Dhara" consists of a single piece of material also fastened at each shoulder.

Marriage 
The Khasis are, for the most part, monogamous. Young men and women are permitted considerable freedom in the choice of mates. Potential marriage partners are likely to have been acquainted before betrothal. Once a man has selected his desired spouse, he reports his choice to his parents. They then secure the services of a mediator to make the arrangements with the woman's family (provided that the man's clan agree with his choice). The parents of the woman ascertain her wishes and if she agrees to the arrangement her parents check to make certain that the man to be wed is not a member of their clan (since Khasi clans are exogamous, marital partners may not be from the same clan). If this is satisfactory then a wedding date is set.

Divorce is relatively common, with causes ranging from incompatibility to lack of offspring. This ceremony traditionally consists of the husband handing the wife 5 cowries or paisa which the wife then hands back to her husband along with 5 of her own. The husband then throws these away or gives them to a village elder who throws them away.  Present-day Khasis divorce through the Indian legal system.

The type of marriage is the determining factor in the marital residence. In short, post marital residence for a married man when an heiress (known as ) is involved must be matrilocal (that is, in his mother-in-law's house), while post-marital residence when a non-heiress is involved is neolocal. Traditionally (though nowadays rule is not absolutely true), a Khasi man returns to his Iing-Kur (maternal home) upon the death of his spouse (if she is a Khadduh and they both have no children). These practices are the result of rules governing inheritance and property ownership. These rules are themselves related to the structure of the Khasi Kur (clan system).

Onomastics 
Khasi names are known for their originality and elaborate nature.  The given names may be invented by parents for their children, and these can be based on traditional native names, Christian names, or other English words.  The family names, which they call "surnames," remain typically in the native Khasi language.

The Khasi people do not have sub-tribes, a confusion that sometimes arises from the expression . This term is mainly based on the geographical location a Khasi inhabits. Khasi inhabiting the northern part are known as Bhoi, as that area is often called Ri Bhoi. People in the east are known as the Pnar, and they call their land Rilum Jaintia. The south are called War or Ri War, because of its mountainous regions and soil fertility. The west has a number of regional names: Maram, Rimen, Khatsawphra, Mawiang, Lyngam. A Khasi who inhabits the central area is known as Khynriam. The War inhabitants of the Khasi community designed and built living root bridges of the War region.

Traditional polities 

The traditional political structure of the Khasi community is democratic in nature. In the past, the Khasis consisted of independent native states called Syiemships, where male elders of various clans under the leadership of the Chief (called U Syiem) would congregate during Durbars or sessions and come to a decision regarding any dispute or problem that would arise in the Syiemship. At the village level, there exists a similar arrangement where all the residents of the village or town come together under the leadership of an elected Headman (called U Rangbah Shnong) to decide on matters pertaining to the locality. This system of village administration is much like the Panchayati Raj prevalent in most Indian States. There were around 25 independent native states on record which were annexed and acceded to the Indian Union. The Syiems of these native states (called Hima) were traditionally elected by the people or ruling clans of their respective domains. Famous among these Syiemships are Hima Mylliem, Hima Khyrim, Hima Nongkhlaw, amongst others. These Syiemships continue to exist and function till today under the purview of the Khasi Hills Autonomous District Council (KHADC), which draws its legal power and authority from the Sixth Schedule of the Constitution of India.

Religion 

Before the arrival of Christian missionaries and post- conversion, almost all of the Khasi people practiced an indigenous tribal religion. The first translation of the Bible into any of the languages of Northeast India was a Khasi version, published in 1891 by missionaries. The main Christian denominations today followed among the Khasis include Catholicism, Anglicanism, Presbyterianism (largest Christian denomination among the Khasis), and others. Around 83.14% of the Khasi tribe numbering around 1.17 million are Christian of various denominations (mainly Presbyterian and Catholic) and 15.41% of them numbering around 2.17 Lakh still follow their Indigenous khasi religion called "Ka Niam Khasi" which is monotheistic in nature. In Khasi traditional religion Niam Khasi, the principal deity U Blei Nongthaw, who is One and formless is the Supreme creator of the whole universe.

A significant small number of Khasi population also adheres to Hindu and Buddhist faith. As per as 2011 census, around 10.3 thousands Khasi people have stated their religion as Hindu and Around 1.8 thousand Khasis follow Buddhism. Lesli Hardinge Pde, a 73-year-old retired Meghalaya civil servant, who is also an Khasi actor, comedian have translated Bhagavad Gita into Khasi language, locally known as "The Song of God or in Khasi, Ka Jingrwai U Blei". The book was published on 9th May, 2011. The author have also translated the Ramayan, the Mahabharat and the Upanishads into Khasi. Historians suggested that the Kamakhya temple of Assam's Nilachal Hills was an ancient sacrificial site for an Austroasiatic tribal goddess, locally called or known as “Ka Mei Kha” (literally: old-cousin-mother), of the Khasi tribe supported by the folk lores of these very peoples. The traditional accounts from Kalika Purana of (10th century) and the Yogini Tantra too recorded that the goddess Kamakhya is of Kirata origin, and It is said that the worship of Kamakhya goddess predates the establishment of Kamarupa in (4th century CE).

There is also an endogamous very small community of Khasi Muslims, mostly residing in Shillong and adjoining areas of the city, who accepted Sunni Islam as a result of historic Muslim traders in the region. On 3rd February, 2019, Quran, Islamic Holy Book, was released in the Khasi language. The translation of 1251 pre-pages and pages of Quran, was done by a Khasi Muslim leader Mubarak Lyngdoh, to propagates Islam among the local Khasis. The translation was done at the initiative of the Seng Bhalang Islam (A local Islamic organization of Shillong, Meghalaya). Khasi Muslims numbers around 1,689 as per 2011 census. 

There are also a small segment of Khasi population who don't follow any particular faith. Around 6.8 thousand Khasis have stated that they are atheist and don't believe in any particular religion or God as per 2011 census.

Fertility rate 
According to a 1998-99 research by the National Family Health Survey of India (NFHS), the Khasi tribe, along with Jayantia and Garo had the highest fertility in India at TFR=4.57.

Genetics
According to genetic study in 2007, the Khasi people of Meghalaya carry around 72.8% Haplogroup O, 10.8% Haplogroup F, 6.5%  halpogroup H and 4.4% Haplogroup P.

Notable people 

Bonily Khongmen, Indian politician from the Indian National Congress party, Former member of Lok Sabha
James Michael Lyngdoh, former Chief Election Commissioner of India
U Kiang Nangbah, freedom fighter
Keishing Clifford Nongrum, MVC, Mahavir Chakra awardee (posthumously)
Neil Nongkynrih, director of the Shillong Chamber Choir
J. J. M. Nichols Roy (Rev. James Joy Mohan Nichols Roy) member of the Constituent Assembly of India, pioneer of the Sixth Schedule of the Constitution of India "which established autonomous district councils in tribal areas in the north-east"
George Gilbert Swell, former Deputy Speaker of the Lok Sabha and Ambassador to Norway and Burma
Silverine Swer, Indian social and environmental activist, educationist and civil servant.
U Tirot Sing Syiem, freedom fighter
David R. Syiemlieh, former chairman, Union Public Service Commission (UPSC)
Skendrowell Syiemlieh, Notable Khasi folk singer and Padmashree awardee.
Sayeedullah Nongrum, Khasi philanthropist and three-time MLA

See also 
 Khasi pine
 Tirot Sing
 Anglo-Khasi War
 Tungrymbai

References

Sources

External links 

 Census of India 2001, Scheduled Tribes
 The Khasis by Gurdon, P. R. T.
 Government of Meghalaya Portal
 Dictionary German Khasi
 Khasi Folk Songs and Tales, translated into English by Desmond L. Kharmawphlang and translated into Hindi by A.R. Tripathi

 
Tribes of Meghalaya
Ethnic groups in Bangladesh
Scheduled Tribes of Assam
Scheduled Tribes of Meghalaya
Ethnic groups in Northeast India
Ethnic groups in South Asia